The Oskaloosa Fire Station is a historic building located in Oskaloosa, Iowa, United States.  It was designed by Des Moines architect Frank E. Wetherell, an Oskaloosa native, in the Renaissance Revival style. It was originally designed along with the adjoining city hall in 1905.  The buildings were designed for phased construction, and the city council decided to build the fire station first.  Completed in 1908, it is a three-story brick building with a 4½-story bell tower.  The fire station was individually listed on the National Register of Historic Places in 1991.  Previously it had been included as a contributing property in the Oskaloosa City Square Commercial Historic District.

References

Fire stations completed in 1908
Oskaloosa, Iowa
Renaissance Revival architecture in Iowa
Buildings and structures in Mahaska County, Iowa
National Register of Historic Places in Mahaska County, Iowa
Fire stations on the National Register of Historic Places in Iowa
Individually listed contributing properties to historic districts on the National Register in Iowa
1908 establishments in Iowa